The 2006 Thomas & Uber Cup was held from 28 April to 7 May in Sendai and Tokyo, Japan. It was the 24th tournament of Thomas Cup and 21st tournament of Uber Cup, men's and women's badminton tournaments.

Sendai hosted all of the group stage and play-off matches while Tokyo hosted the event starting from the quarter finals until the final.

This was first time the Thomas & Uber Cup was played with a three-game 21-point scoring system.

China emerged as champions of both tournaments after beating Denmark and Netherlands in the men's and women's competitions respectively.

Host city selection
Japan, which was competing with Indonesia and the United States for hosting the 2004 Thomas and Uber Cup finals, was awarded with this event.

Venues
Sendai Gymnasium
Tokyo Metropolitan Gymnasium

Teams
The following nations from five continents, shown by region, qualified for the 2006 Thomas & Uber Cup. Of the sixteen nations, defending champion of both tournaments China and host Japan qualified automatically and did not play the qualification round.

Thomas & Uber Cup
 China
 England
 Germany
 Japan
 Korea
 New Zealand
 United States
 South Africa

Thomas Cup
 Denmark
 India
 Indonesia
 Malaysia

Uber Cup
 Chinese Taipei
 Hong Kong
 Netherlands
 Singapore

Thomas Cup

Group stage

Group A

All times local (UTC +9)

Group B

All times local (UTC +9)

Group C
 

All times local (UTC +9)

Group D

All times local (UTC +9)

Knockout stage

Semi finals

Final

Uber Cup

Group stage

Group W

All times local (UTC +9)

Group X

All times local (UTC +9)

Group Y

All times local (UTC +9)

Group Z

All times local (UTC +9)

Knockout stage

Semi finals

Final

References

External links
Official Website

Thomas Uber Cup
Thomas and Uber Cup
Thomas & Uber Cup
T
Badminton tournaments in Japan